Nadja Sieger (* 22. Mai 1968 in Zürich) is a Swiss comedian, singer, writer, actress and producer, better known as Nadeschkin of the comedian duo Ursus & Nadeschkin.

Life and career 
Born 1968 in Zürich, Nadja Sieger attended a Gymnasium in Zurich. Before she received the baccalaureate in 1988 (Maturität Typus B). She has been working as a street performer with Urs Wehrli, and is acting since 1987 as Nadeschkin. In 1989 Nadia Sieger toured with Karls kühne Gassenschau. In 2004 she featured in the Swiss television film Fremde im Paradies, 2005/2006 as co-author in a film not yet shown, as director in the independent theater scene and since 2005 from time to time as Jazz singer (Swing Time Dance ArchestrA, Big Band Connection and Swingtime Pocket Archestra). On 22 December 2010 Nadja Sieger's son was born. Just for fun, Nadja Sieger is member of the Lindy Hop Dancer. In 2013 Nadja Sieger acted as voice actress in the Swiss-German animation film S'Chline Gspängst (The Little Ghost). She wrote as columnist in the Swiss newspaper Berner Zeitung. In October 2014 Nadja Sieger was also involved as producer of the comedians Starbugs and director of their 2014/2015 tour. On 29 September 2016 the duo started its 30-year celebration tour.

Ursus & Nadeschkin 
Ursus & Nadeschkin started in 1987 as street performers, and in 2002 they became the leading act and headline of the Swiss National Circus Knie, performing 257 times during the 2002 season tour and having an audience totaling one million spectators. As in 2014, they acted in about 2,705 productions in small theaters, television, theater, circus and concert halls, so in Austria, Germany, Italy, former Yugoslavia and Switzerland, as well as in Australia, in the UK and the USA.

Awards 
 1996: Scheinbar Preis Berlin
 1997: Prix Walo
 1999: Schweizer Kleinkunstpreis «Goldener Thunfisch»
 2000: New York Fringe Award for best comedian theater, international Fringe.Festival
 2000: Prix Walo
 2001: Deutscher Kleinkunstpreis
 2001: Award by the Canton of Zürich («innovative Theaterarbeit»)
 2001: Salzburger Stier
 2004: Leipziger Löwenzahn
 2008: Hans-Reinhart-Ring award
 2009: Swiss of the year, 3rd place («Schweizer/In des Jahres») 
 2011: Publikumsliebling, Arosa Humorfestival
 2012: Ehren Cornichon
as Nadeschkin of the comedian duo Ursus & Nadeschkin

Selected filmography
 2004: Fremde im Paradies (Strangers in Paradise, TV) as Flora
 2007: Was gibt es Neues? (TV, Episode #1.101) as herself
 2013: S'Chline Gspängst (The Little Ghost, voice actress)

References

External links 

  
 Ursus & Nadeschkin
 

1968 births
Living people
Swiss women comedians
Entertainers from Zürich
20th-century Swiss actresses
Swiss publishers (people)
Swiss television actresses
Swiss jazz singers
Swiss writers in German
Kabarettists
20th-century Swiss writers
21st-century Swiss writers
21st-century Swiss actresses
21st-century Swiss businesswomen
21st-century Swiss businesspeople
20th-century Swiss businesswomen
20th-century Swiss businesspeople
20th-century Swiss women writers
21st-century Swiss women writers
Swiss producers
Swiss voice actresses
Swiss theatre people
21st-century Swiss women singers
20th-century Swiss women  singers
20th-century dramatists and playwrights
21st-century dramatists and playwrights
Women dramatists and playwrights